Jorge Arriagada (born 1943) is a Chilean film composer. He is perhaps best known for his long-term collaboration with director Raúl Ruiz. He has also worked with directors Patricio Guzman, Barbet Schroeder and Olivier Assayas.

Biography

Jorge Arriagada was born on August 20, 1943 in Santiago. He studied composition and orchestral conduction at the National Conservatory of Music in Santiago. He then obtained a scholarship from the French government that enabled him to study expressionism with Max Deutsch, who was Austrian composer Arnold Schoenberg's friend and student. He also studied composition with Olivier Messiaen and orchestral conduction with Pierre Boulez. In 1972, the Guggenheim Foundation in New York awarded him a fellowship for his contribution in the field of electronic music.

Arriagada has been living in France since 1966, working with experienced as well as promising directors while composing the scores of 44 of Raúl Ruiz's films. Over the years he has explored many different genres, including classical, contemporary and folk music as well as jazz.

He has been a jury in several film festivals, including San Sebastian, São Paulo, Valencia, among others.

Sacem Grand Prize for Music for the Image 2020.

Filmography

Discography 
Three original soundtracks composed by Arriagada can be found on the CD compilation Les Musiques de Jorge Arriagada pour les films de Philippe Le Guay, released by Canadian label Disques Cinémusique, in 2013 : Alceste à Bicyclette, Les Femmes du 6e étage et Les Deux Fragonard. French and English liner notes. More information here.

The same label also released the same year Arriagada's complete original soundtrack from Les Lignes de Wellington. More information here.

External links

1943 births
Living people
Chilean male composers
Chilean film score composers
Musicians from Santiago
Male film score composers